The Riverside Swinging Bridge, northeast of Riverside, Texas, is a swinging bridge which was built in 1904.  It is the last swinging railroad bridge in Texas.  It brings the  Missouri Pacific Railroad between Trinity County, Texas and Walker County, Texas.  It was built by the International and Great Northern Railroad to cross the Trinity River.  It was listed on the National Register of Historic Places in 1979.

It is a Pratt truss structure.

The bridge has hardly ever swung.  It was turned first during an inauguration ceremony, and was turned again in 1925 to allow debris from a flood to pass the bridge.

See also 
 Third Street Railroad Trestle: another IGN bridge also on the National Register of Historic Places

References

External links

Swing bridges in the United States
Bridges on the National Register of Historic Places in Texas
National Register of Historic Places in Trinity County, Texas
National Register of Historic Places in Walker County, Texas
Bridges completed in 1904
1904 establishments in Texas
Missouri Pacific Railroad
Transportation in Trinity County, Texas
Transportation in Walker County, Texas
Pratt truss bridges in the United States
Trinity River (Texas)